The Women's Tournament of Champions 2014 is the women's edition of the 2014 Tournament of Champions, which is a tournament of the WSA World Tour event Gold (prize money: 50 000 $). The event took place at the Grand Central Terminal in New York City in the United States from 18 January to 24 January. Nicol David won her first Tournament of Champions trophy, beating Laura Massaro in the final.

Prize money and ranking points
For 2014, the prize purse was $50,000. The prize money and points breakdown is as follows:

Seeds

Draw and results

See also
WSA World Tour 2014
Men's Tournament of Champions 2014
Tournament of Champions (squash)

References

External links
WSA Tournament of Champions 2014 website
Tournament of Champions 2014 official website

Women's Tournament of Champions
Women's Tournament of Champions
2014 in women's squash
Tournament of Champions (squash)